Owtar or Autar may refer to:
 Owtar, Haviq
 Owtar, Kargan Rud